Kournas is a mountainous village of Municipality of Apokoronas, Chania, on the Greek island of Crete. It has a population of 500 citizens. It is located at 200 meters altitude and south-east of the mountain named Dafnomadara (1680 meters).

Kournas is a fairly large village perched on a hill overlooking Lake Kournas. It was in the former Georgioupoli municipality, not far from the town of the same name. A working village which has seen less depopulation than some of its neighbours, Kournas is known for its pottery and many popular taverns. The taverna's seats are largely in the road - it is popular for its specialties of 'kokoretsi' (grilled offal) and 'galaktoboureko' (custard and orange tart).

Populated places in Chania (regional unit)